Maria Yoon (born 1971), a.k.a. Maria the Korean Bride, is a New York-based performance artist and filmmaker. She is best known for her extended performance art project and film where in the course of nine years, she gets married in all 50 of the United States, Puerto Rico, the District of Columbia and the US Virgin Islands.

Background and education
Born in Seoul, the oldest of three, Yoon's family immigrated to the US when she was seven. She grew up in Queens, the Bronx, and Staten Island, New York, and graduated from Cooper Union with a  Bachelor of Fine Arts. She attended Skowhegan School of Painting and Sculpture in 1994.

Early work
Yoon felt an inordinate pressure from her parents and the Korean American community to marry after turning 30. She first responded by making a calendar full of bachelors who wanted to propose to her to start a conversation with her father. The Marriage Proposal Series 2003 Calendar sold out of its first printing at the New Museum bookstore. Yoon, however, felt the project reinforced stereotypical male roles  and since has reflected on its impact. Some of her bachelors include Mr. August, also known as James Luna.

Maria the Korean Bride
She took the hanbok her mother had given her for her 30th birthday and decided to make a further art project out of it. She started by marrying two people in Las Vegas on a friend's vacation trip. She married in Hawaii in a traditional wedding ceremony. In Detroit, she married an artist dressed as Death. When she experienced racism in Wisconsin, she married a shirt representing the company where she experienced the incident. Her final wedding was held in Times Square in New York City, officiated by Jimmy McMillan, of the Rent is Too Damn High party. Yoon selected her husband from a raffle.

Yoon writes the all vows herself and never smiles out of cultural respect and to honor Korean wedding ceremony custom. She has expressed that Wyoming was her favorite experience in the U.S. for the change of scenery it offered and people's friendliness. Though awarded a number of grants and donations, the project was largely self-funded.

Screenings
The film version has been screened at ATA Gallery in San Francisco, MTS Gallery in Anchorage, the Manifest in Honolulu, UT Austin, Stony Brook University, and various film festivals like the FEM Cine of Santiago, Chile and in Atlanta, Sarasota, Florida and Naperville, Illinois, among other places. The 2013 New York City premiere, held at the BMCC Tribeca Performing Arts Center, sold out.

Responses to the work
In Montana, the minister, a recent newlywed, said "She’s asking some really good questions about the institution." In New Hampshire Yoon got lectured by a minister on the project and there have been people who have bowed out of the project because of her support of gay marriage.

Ghost weddings

After learning about police in northwest China charging a man with murdering two women with mental disabilities, alleging that he wanted to sell their corpses to be used in so-called "ghost weddings" on BBC.com, Yoon took an interest in incorporating the old practice of marrying the dead into her work. In July 2017, after a local Taoist priest had an omen that marrying a deceased man would be unlucky, Yoon married an imaginary husband at a Taoist temple in the Xizhi District of New Taipei City, Taiwan. She wore a pink hanbok with her wrist tied with a red string to a memorial tablet representing the fake individual. Still, many Taiwanese avoided attending the filming of the performance out of superstition, and the priest ritually cleansed the film crew with incense.

Other work and exhibitions
She did a one-woman show at the Collective Unconscious in downtown Manhattan in 2007 and at the Abrons Art Center the next year. She was included in the show "Me Love You Long Time" that travelled from Newark's Aljira Center for Contemporary Art to Mills Gallery at the Boston Center for the Arts in 2013.

Yoon is also a master storyteller who has presented at the American Museum of Natural History, Newark Museum, and the Korea Society. Currently she teaches and lectures at the Metropolitan Museum of Art and the Morgan Library & Museum in New York City.

Collections
Smith College, Scripps College, Otis College of Art and Design, Museum of Modern Art, Temple University, Wellesley College's Book Art Collection, Haverford College, University of Melbourne Library, and private collections.

Personal life
She lives and works in Tribeca in New York City.

Awards and recognition
Pollock-Krasner Foundation 
Abrons Art Center artists residency, 1999-2000
Manhattan Community Arts Fund, LMCC
Asian Women Giving Circle, 2008 
Franklin Furnace Fund 2008-09
New York State Council on the Arts, 2009
Director's Award, Atlanta Korean Film Festival, 2013
Named by HuffPost one of "10 Documentaries About Artists in Love You Need to Watch," 2014

Filmography and TV appearances
Maria the Korean Bride: The Voice of Asian American Women, 2013
Cake Boss, TLC, Season 4, Episode 28, "A Funny Regis and Fifty Weddings"
 KBS Documentary Age: The story of a woman who has 50 weddings (KBS 다큐시대 – 50번의 결혼식을 올린 여자의 이야기), 2011

References

Further reading

External links
Maria the Korean Bride website
Maria the Korean Bride YouTube channel
Marriage Proposal Series II

1971 births
Living people
American conceptual artists
South Korean women artists
American women film directors
Women conceptual artists
Feminist artists
South Korean feminists
South Korean emigrants to the United States
Cooper Union alumni
21st-century American artists
21st-century women artists
21st-century American women